The Ouse Valley Viaduct (or the Balcombe Viaduct) carries the London-Brighton Railway Line over the River Ouse in Sussex. It is located to the north of Haywards Heath and the south of Balcombe. Known for its ornate design, the structure has been described as "probably the most elegant viaduct in Britain."

Construction of the Ouse Valley Viaduct commenced by the London & Brighton Railway company in 1839. It was designed by the principal engineer for the line, John Urpeth Rastrick, in association with the architect of the London to Brighton railway, David Mocatta. Each pier contains a jack arch with a semi-circular soffit, which had the benefit of reducing the number of bricks required. The roughly 11 million bricks required for its construction were mostly shipped up the River Ouse (via Newhaven and Lewes) from the Netherlands. On 12 July 1841, the viaduct was officially opened to train services, although the structure was not fully completed until the following year.

Despite the structure's fine design, materials, and architectural features, the viaduct has had an expensive and problematic history. The first major restoration work occurred during the 1890s, during which sections of the original brickwork were entirely replaced in the belief that this would increase the structure's strength. However, the viaduct suffered considerable decay during the majority of the twentieth century. By May 1983, the viaduct had been recognised as a Grade II* listed structure. Between March 1996 and September 1999, the viaduct was subject to an extensive restoration by national rail infrastructure owner Railtrack; this work was part-funded by the Railway Heritage Trust, English Heritage and West Sussex County Council.

Construction
In July 1837, an Act of Parliament was passed which gave the London & Brighton Railway company assent to construct its proposed railway line between London and the south coast. The route selected, which was surveyed by a team headed by Sir John Rennie, was fairly direct but had the downside of crossing over some relatively hilly terrain. As a consequence of a decision to limit gradients along the line to 1 in 264, the construction of a total of four tunnels and a single viaduct, the latter crossing the Ouse Valley between Balcombe and Haywards Heath in West Sussex, was necessary.

Construction of the new line commenced in July 1838; work to build the ornate viaduct began during the following year. It was designed by the principal engineer for the line, John Urpeth Rastrick, in association with the architect of the London to Brighton railway, David Mocatta. The contractor appointed for its construction was Benjamin Baylis. The total cost of the viaduct's construction reportedly came to £38,500 (equivalent to about £3.3 million in 2022).

Each pier was almost divided into two separate halves by  vertical voids, capped by semi-circular rings at the top and base, as a weight-saving measure. This approach is credited with giving the structure a relatively slender appearance.

The viaduct is predominantly composed of traditional red bricks and smooth limestone. The contrast between the two materials effectively highlights the deck and upper elements of the structure, although the limestone has been subjected to considerable weathering and staining since its original installation. The brickwork and the limestone elements have been replaced over time to maintain the structure's integrity, extend its operational life, and restore its appearance to better resemble its original state.

It has been estimated that around 11 million bricks, many of which had been shipped across the English Channel from the Netherlands to Newhaven and Lewes, in addition to some locally produced bricks, were used for the structure. Furthermore, Caen stone was also brought from Normandy in France; this material was used for the classically balustraded parapets, string courses, pier caps and the four small rectangular Italianate pavilions. Building materials were transported to the construction site on barges up the Ouse River Navigation. At each end of the abutment is an ornamental square open tower, the brickwork of which is faced with stone from Heddon Quarries near Newcastle-upon-Tyne.

Opening

The Brighton Main Line was opened in two sections because completion was delayed by the need to construct some major earthworks. The viaduct was officially opened when the section between Norwood Junction and Haywards Heath was opened on 12 July 1841. Initially, there was only one track across the structure in operation; the second line, along with the viaduct's ornate stone parapets and pavilions, was not completed until the following year.

By 1846, the viaduct had become part of the London, Brighton and South Coast Railway. In 1923, as a result of the Railways Act 1921, it became part of the Southern Railway network. It remained under Southern's ownership until January 1948, when the nationalisation of the Big Four railway companies formed the publicly owned railway operator British Railways.

Maintenance and restoration
The first major restoration work occurred during the 1890s, and was focused on repairs to the brickwork. Engineers of the late Victorian era were concerned that the original lime mortar used in the viaduct's construction was inadequate and the decision was made to replace it with cement mortar. However, the replacement facing brickwork and substandard mortar eventually caused its own failures prompting more expensive repairs later on. This was likely due to the repair work having borne a greater share of the structure's load than intended, resulting in an accelerated failure rate. Poorly bonded header bricks are another probable culprit for its ineffectiveness. Additionally, the parapets and pavilions, although made from Caen stone (a high-quality limestone), have been subjected to heavy weathering.

By 1956, the damage to the viaduct was extensive but the cost of refurbishment work was deemed too high by British Rail. The degradation was partially a consequence of the structure's long lifespan: when originally constructed in the 1840s, its intended design life was only 120 years. By May 1983, the viaduct had been officially recognised as a Grade II* listed structure.

By the 1980s, the eight pavilions present on the viaduct were in such a poor condition that some of their roofs had fallen in and the installation of internal props was required to halt their further collapse. As a consequence of its heritage status, all envisioned alterations to the viaduct need to be reviewed and agreed upon by English Heritage. When British Rail proposed to dismantle the original pavilions and rebuild them using reconstituted stonework, English Heritage refused permissions; accordingly, there was no substantial restoration performed to the viaduct during this period, a decision which British Rail publicly attributed to the sizeable estimated cost of such works. The fabric of the structure continued to deteriorate over the next decade, with sections of stonework falling away from the balustrades and parapets.

Starting in March 1996, the viaduct underwent a £6.5 million renovation overseen by the national rail infrastructure company Railtrack and partially funded by grants from West Sussex County Council, Railway Heritage Trust and English Heritage. Harder-wearing limestone was imported from Bordeaux to ensure the closest match with the existing Caen stone in the balustrades and pavilions. Some of the piers had to be reconstructed because of failures in the Victorian brickwork. The new bricks were handmade in a variety of sizes to suit the existing brickwork and set in sand, cement, and lime mortar; stainless steel anchoring was used to firmly fix the new stone to the old stonework. Throughout the work, one of the lines always remained open while restoration activity was being carried out on the other side of the viaduct. The project, which took more than three years, was completed in September 1999.

References

Citations

Bibliography

 
 

Railway viaducts in West Sussex
Deck arch bridges
Grade II* listed buildings in West Sussex
David Mocatta buildings
Grade II* listed railway bridges and viaducts